Sherkat Melli Haffari Iran Futsal Club (Bashgah-e Futsal-e Shirkât-e Mili-ye Hefari Iran) is an Iranian professional futsal club based in Ahvaz.

Season to season

The table below chronicles the achievements of the Club in various competitions.

Last updated: 14 March 2022

Players

Current squad

World cup players 

 World Cup 2012
  Alireza Samimi

 World Cup 2016
  Farhad Tavakoli

Notable players

Personnel

Current technical staff

Last updated: January 7, 2022

See also
 Sherkat Melli Haffari Football Club

References 

Futsal clubs in Iran
Sport in Ahvaz